Piano Sonata in B-flat major may refer to:

 Piano Sonata No. 11 (Beethoven)
 Piano Sonata No. 29 (Beethoven)
 Piano Sonata Hob. XVI/17 (Haydn)
 Piano Sonata Hob. XVI/18 (Haydn)
 Piano Sonata No. 3 (Mozart)
 Piano Sonata No. 13 (Mozart)
 Piano Sonata No. 17 (Mozart)
 Piano Sonata K. 498a (Mozart)
 Piano Sonata No. 7 (Prokofiev)
 Piano Sonata No. 8 (Prokofiev)
 Piano Sonata D. 960 (Schubert)
 Sonata for piano four-hands, D 617 (Schubert)